Ak-Beket (- Bely-Piket) is a village in the Chüy Region of Kyrgyzstan. It lies on the left bank of the river Chu. Its population was 1,013 in 2021.

Climate
Ak-Beket has Mediterranean continental climate (Köppen climate classification: Dsb).

References

Populated places in Chüy Region